Khooni Tantrik (Murderous Tantric) is a Hindi horror film of Bollywood directed by Teerat Singh. This film was released in 2001 by Shagufta Arts productions.

Plot 
Rajan and Rajani are childless couple. Rajani always goes to temples and worshiped Tantrik in order to give birth. Her arrogant husband does not like such activities. One night Rajani goes to one powerful Tantrik, Bhaironath to seek his blessings, Rajan suspects her and kill Bhaironath thinking her wife has an illicit relation with that Tantrik. Bhootnath, the brother of Bhaironath take avenge of this. He kills Rajan and also curse Rajani to give birth a devil child. Consequently, an evil baby is born which become a demon and start killing people.

Cast 
 Joginder as Gobar Baba
 Deepak Shirke as Bhaironath/ Bhootnath
 Poonam Dasgupta as Rajani
 Shiva Rindani as Rajan
 Mahima Sahay as Seema
 Vishal Bubna as Vishal
 Ena Chauhan as Mahi
 Ramesh Goyal as Durjan Singh
 Sudha Kapoor

References

External links
 

2001 films
2000s Hindi-language films
Indian horror films
2001 horror films
Hindi-language horror films